Sentimental Tommy is a 1921 American silent drama film directed by John S. Robertson. It featured Mary Astor in one of her earliest roles, although her scenes were deleted before release. The story is based on James M. Barrie's novel. The film, which made a star of Gareth Hughes, is now considered a lost film.

Plot 
As described in a film publication, Grizel (McAvoy) is the daughter of the Painted Lady (Taliaferro), who believes that her lover will one day return. Grizel is ostracized by the other children of the town. Tommy Sandys (Hughes) and his sister Elspeth (Frost) come to the town. Tommy is friendly, but Elspeth keeps her distance. When the Painted Lady dies, Dr. Gemmell (Greene) makes Grizel his housekeeper.

Time passes and after the doctor dies, Grizel, who is now twenty-one years old, loves Tommy, who is an author in London. Tommy visits the town but cannot decide whether he loves Grizel. Grizel knows that Tommy does not love her, and after he returns to London her unhappiness leads to insanity. Tommy returns and marries Grizel, although he believes that she will hate him when she gets better. After two years under Tommy's care, she regains her sanity. After Tommy lets her know that he cared for her out of his love for her; not for pity, Grizel is happy.

Cast

Reception 
The film received mixed reviews upon its release on May 29, 1921. The Minneapolis Morning Tribune expressed admiration for the film's acting; calling out director John S. Robertson for this "very fine film," it noted in particular the film's handling of emotion. The review also remarked that Hughes, a popular Welsh actor, was a big hit with the fans.

According to The Philadelphia Inquirer, "there is the tender, elusive quality, the charm and the pathos, the humor, the quality which could bring one to tears while smiling." The reviewer called the depiction of Tommy growing from child to man as "simply spectacular." Variety stated that it must have been "a great pleasure" to record a movie that is so fine and expresses admiration the translation of the book to screen. The reviewer notes that Tommy is a "profound character in this film particular," and praises the film's direction. People were infatuated with the actor behind Tommy's character, Gareth Hughes, and believed that he well portrayed the Tommy people knew and loved in the novel.

The Christian Science Monitor stated the film "respects its original novel that was printed years prior to the movie." The author of the article states how Tommy's story is told with "numerous titles but, happily, they are written by someone with an active intelligence." The reviewer likened the film to The Four Horsemen, The Ole Swimming Hole, and Thrums of Long Island.

Sherwood, from Life Magazine reviews Sentimental Tommy with a list of pros and cons. He mentions that the director, John S. Robertson, displays a "commendable degree of good taste throughout." This "perfect interpretation" of the novel leads him to say that he was surprised how well the film turned out considering the unusual settings in the novel. The one thing that bothered Sherwood was that the film was "far too long."

Negative reviews included one that ran in The Minneapolis Morning Tribune, where the headline read "Reviewer calls happy ending only real weakness of screen version." Life expressed dissatisfaction with the top ten movies of 1921, Sentimental Tommy among them, suggesting that an unwritten law has landed these "trendy movies" at the top.

References

External links 

 
 
 Still at silentfilmstillarchive.com

1921 films
American silent feature films
Films directed by John S. Robertson
Lost American films
American black-and-white films
Paramount Pictures films
Silent American drama films
1921 drama films
1921 lost films
Lost drama films
1920s American films
Films based on British novels